Sharafabad (also Romanized as Sharafābād; also known as Sharīfābād) is a village in Rostaq Rural District, in the Central District of Saduq County, Yazd Province, Iran. At the 2006 census, its population was 736, in 218 families.

References 

Populated places in Saduq County